Dwayne Dunn (born 1973 or 1974) is an Australian jockey based in Victoria. He won the Scobie Breasley Medal in 2016.

Dunn began his career in 1989. He rode his first Group One winner on Undoubtedly in the 2005 Blue Diamond Stakes at Caulfield. He holds the jockeys’ record for numbers of wins in the Blue Diamond with five. He rode All Too Hard 10 times for seven wins, four of them at Group One level. As of late May 2021, he has ridden 2,185 winners, including 24 in Group One races.

Dunn suffered a neck fracture and a brain injury at Moonee Valley in September 2020 when his mount Shot Of Irish reared in the starting gate. After attempting to resume riding he found the brain trauma was too severe and long-lasting, and in May 2021 he decided to concentrate on achieving a full recovery, leaving his riding future in doubt.

References

1970s births
Living people
Australian jockeys